Kevin Wesley Kobayashi from RF Micro Devices, Torrance, California, was named Fellow of the Institute of Electrical and Electronics Engineers (IEEE) in 2013 for contributions to monolithic microwave integrated circuits (MMIC).

References

Fellow Members of the IEEE
21st-century American engineers
Living people
Year of birth missing (living people)
Place of birth missing (living people)
American electrical engineers